Jerry Tollbring (born 13 September 1995) is a Swedish handball player for GOG Håndbold and the Swedish national team.

He participated at the 2016 European Men's Handball Championship.

Individual awards 
All-Star Left wing of the World Championship: 2017

Personal life
He is the brother of Cassandra Tollbring. He is in a relationship with international handball player Nora Mørk.

References

External links

1995 births
Living people
Swedish male handball players
People from Norrtälje
IFK Kristianstad players
Handball players at the 2016 Summer Olympics
Olympic handball players of Sweden
Expatriate handball players
Swedish expatriate sportspeople in Germany
Handball-Bundesliga players
Rhein-Neckar Löwen players
Sportspeople from Stockholm County